Room with a View of the Blues is an album by the American blues musician Johnny Adams, released in 1988. Adams won a W.C. Handy Award for the album.

Production
The album was produced by Scott Billington. It contains songs written by Percy Mayfield, Lowell Fulsom, and Doc Pomus, with instrumentation provided by Dr. John and Walter "Wolfman" Washington, among others.

Critical reception

AllMusic wrote that "with great support from an instrumental corps that includes guitarists Walter 'Wolfman' Washington and Duke Robillard, keyboardist Dr. John, and saxophonists Red Tyler and Foots Samuel, plus Ernie Gautreau on valve trombone, Adams didn't just cut a blues album, he made unforgettable blues statements." The Washington Post thought that the album "clearly ranks among his best work," writing that "although Adams' voice is remarkably agile, the album's performances are more restrained and bluesy than usual." Newsweek declared that "Adams may be the best not-quite-famous singer in the world."

Track listing

References

1988 albums
Rounder Records albums